Miroslav Tretina  (born January 27, 1980) is a Czech professional ice hockey player. He played with HC Slavia Praha in the Czech Extraliga during the 2010–11 Czech Extraliga season.

References

External links

1980 births
Czech ice hockey forwards
HC Slavia Praha players
Living people
People from Humpolec
Sportspeople from the Vysočina Region
Motor České Budějovice players
BK Havlíčkův Brod players
HC Slovan Ústečtí Lvi players
HC Berounští Medvědi players
HC Dukla Jihlava players